Olivia McTaggart (born 9 January 2000) is a pole vault athlete from New Zealand. She was born in Australia and later moved with her family to Greenhithe, in Auckland, New Zealand. She attended Kristin School.

McTaggart was a competitive gymnast for 10 years before changing to pole vaulting due to a back injury in 2014. After less than six months in the sport, she competed at the Australian Junior Championships in the under-16 event and won a bronze medal. 

In 2017 McTaggart broke the New Zealand under-17 record previously held by Eliza McCartney. The height she cleared, 4.40m, placed her third in the world for under-18 athletes and seventh in the world for under-20 athletes. The same year she was a recipient of the AMP National Scholarship.

In 2018, she competed at the Commonwealth Games on the Gold Coast, Australia where she finished ninth with a clearance of 4.30m.  Her brother Cameron also competed at the 2018 Commonwealth Games in the men's 77 kg division weightlifting. That year she also competed at the IAAF World U20 Championships in Tampere, Finland where she finished fifth in the final also with a clearance of 4.30m.

In 2019 Olivia competed at the Universiade in Napoli, Italy, where she finished fourth with a mark of 4.31m.

She represented NZ at the 2022 World Athletics Indoor Championships where she came sixth with a clearance of 4.60m.

Personal bests

Outdoor

Indoor

References

External links
 
 
 

2000 births
Living people
New Zealand female pole vaulters
Commonwealth Games competitors for New Zealand
Athletes (track and field) at the 2018 Commonwealth Games
Athletes (track and field) at the 2022 Commonwealth Games
Australian Athletics Championships winners
People educated at Kristin School
Australian emigrants to New Zealand
People from North Shore, New Zealand
Athletes from Auckland